Pilea elegans is a species in the plant family Urticaceae. It is found in Chile. USDA hardiness zone 9. The plant does not tolerate snow, but can tolerate occasional freezing spells of about -5 degrees C.  Light requirements consist of indirect light/low light (In deep shadow) Can be found in deep ravines in Chile facing south with additional shadow from trees, or where there is a very dense vegetation cover which gives 80 - 100 % shadow (for instance, the Valdivian forests.)

References

External links 

 

elegans
Plants described in 1851
Flora of Chile